Rugby union in Albania is a minor but growing team sport in the country, and progress is continuing with the aim of creating a federation for the sport once four teams become active.

Teams
Tirana Rugby Club (2013–) (rugby league and former rugby union team)
Ilirët Rugby Club (2016–)

References